Andy T. W. Leung (born 26 Jun 1948), is a horse trainer. He worked as an assistant trainer before being granted a full permit to train in Hong Kong starting in 1995/96. He had 17 victories in 2012/13, at the end of which season he had 403.

Performance

References
The Hong Kong Jockey Club – Trainer Information

Other Links
The Hong Kong Jockey Club

Hong Kong horse trainers
Living people
1948 births